Dasycnemia is a genus of snout moths. It was described by Ragonot, in 1891, and is known from Peru, Trinidad, Brazil, and Mexico.

Species
 Dasycnemia depressalis Ragonot, 1891
 Dasycnemia naparimalis (Kaye, 1925)
 Dasycnemia obliqualis (Hampson, 1897)
 Dasycnemia rufofascialis (Capps, 1952)

References

Chrysauginae
Pyralidae genera